Springfield Township is one of the fifteen townships of Gallia County, Ohio, United States.  As of the 2010 census the population was 3,664, up from 3,181 at the 2000 census.

Geography
Located in the northern part of the county, it borders the following townships:
Morgan Township - north
Cheshire Township - northeast corner
Addison Township - east
Gallipolis Township - southeast corner
Green Township - south
Perry Township - southwest corner
Raccoon Township - west
Huntington Township - northwest corner

Springfield Township is one of only two county townships without a border on another county.

No municipalities are located in Springfield Township, although the unincorporated communities of Bidwell and Kerr are located near the center of the township.

Name and history
It is one of eleven Springfield Townships statewide.

Government
The township is governed by a three-member board of trustees, who are elected in November of odd-numbered years to a four-year term beginning on the following January 1. Two are elected in the year after the presidential election and one is elected in the year before it. There is also an elected township fiscal officer, who serves a four-year term beginning on April 1 of the year after the election, which is held in November of the year before the presidential election. Vacancies in the fiscal officership or on the board of trustees are filled by the remaining trustees.

References

External links
County website

Townships in Gallia County, Ohio
Townships in Ohio